Paul Pritchard Shipyard, also known as State Shipyard, Rose's Shipyard, and Begbie & Manson's Shipyard, is a historic shipyard site located at Mount Pleasant, Charleston County, South Carolina. The shipyard was in operation as early as 1702, and was the site of an attack made during the French and Spanish invasion of 1706.  It was acquired by Paul Pritchard and sold to the commissioners of the South Carolina Navy in 1778, and was South Carolina's only state shipyard at the time. It was sold back to Pritchard after the American Revolutionary War, who with his son operated it until 1831. It was listed on the National Register of Historic Places in 1974.

References

Shipyards of the United States
Archaeological sites on the National Register of Historic Places in South Carolina
1702 establishments in South Carolina
Buildings and structures in Charleston County, South Carolina
National Register of Historic Places in Charleston County, South Carolina
Shipyards on the National Register of Historic Places
Mount Pleasant, South Carolina
Industrial buildings and structures in South Carolina